K. N. Chandrasekharan Pillai is an Indian legal academic. He is the former director of the Indian Law Institute. He now lives in Cochin.

Early life and education
Pillai is from Chunakkara in the district of Alappuzha, Kerala. He received his B.Sc. from the University of Kerala and received his  LL.B. and LL.M. (first rank) from the University of Delhi. He received the Baboo Piare Lal Memorial Prize and the Delhi University Law Union prize, 1974. He received his second LL.M and S.J.D. from the University of Michigan Law School in the United States. He was also the first Director of National University of Advanced Legal Studies (Formerly NIALS). He is now on the editorial board of Cochin University Law Review and Academy Law Review.

Career
Pillai practiced law before the Supreme Court of India before joining the Campus Law Centre at the University of Delhi. He joined Cochin University of Science and Technology and became director and later dean of the School of Legal Studies there. He served as the director-designate of the National University of Advanced Legal Studies, Cochin. After that he became the Director of Indian Law institute. He was  the Director of National Judicial Academy, Bhopal till 31-03-2013. He has been pursuing his academic activities from Cochin. He is the author of a book on criminal law and is the revised author of R V Kelkar's Lectures on Criminal Procedure and Text Book on Criminal Procedure Code.

Mr. Pillai is, a part-time member of the Law Commission of India, member of the syndicate of Cochin University of Science and Technology representing the University Grants Commission, editor of the Journal Section of Supreme Court Cases, Lucknow. He is also the editor of the Journal of the Indian Law Institute, New Delhi and is a member of the editorial boards of the Cochin University Law Review, Academy Law Review, Kerala Bar Council News, and Bangalore Law Journal. He is also the member of the academic council of National University of Advanced Legal Studies.

Pillai is the author of several books.
Dr.Pillai was the Director, Indian Law Institute and thereafter he was Director, National Judicial academy National Judicial Academy, India at Bhopal. He reviews the RV Kelkar Criminal Procedue and Lectures on Criminal Procedure periodically. He loves his students and gives the opportunity to his students ti assist him in reviewing the books. Latest, he took assistance of his student Mr.K.Pattabhi Rama rao, Assistant Director (Law), S.V.P.National Police Academy to review his Lectures on Criminal Procedure. At present he is residing in Kochi.

References

External links
 Women and Criminal Procedure
 Criminal Procedure Code
 Double Jeopardy Protection 
 Rathinam v. Union of India- A Comment
 Burden of Proof in Criminal Cases and the Supreme Court— New Trends

People from Kerala
Living people
University of Kerala alumni
Delhi University alumni
University of Michigan Law School alumni
Year of birth missing (living people)